Charles William Berry Littlejohn  (4 January 1889 – 4 August 1960) was a New Zealand-born rower who competed for Great Britain in the 1912 Summer Olympics.

Born in Nelson, New Zealand, on 4 January 1889, Littlejohn was the son of William Still Littlejohn and Jeannie Littlejohn (née Berry). He was educated at Nelson College from 1898 to 1903, and later went to New College, Oxford as a Rhodes Scholar (from Ormond College, Melbourne University) where he was a Diploma student in anthropology. He was a member of the winning Oxford crews in the Boat Race in 1911 and 1912. He was also a member of the New College eight which won the silver medal for Great Britain rowing at the 1912 Summer Olympics. He was subsequently decorated with the Military Cross while serving in World War I.

See also
List of Oxford University Boat Race crews

References

1889 births
1960 deaths
Alumni of New College, Oxford
British male rowers
New Zealand male rowers
Olympic rowers of Great Britain
Rowers at the 1912 Summer Olympics
Olympic silver medallists for Great Britain
New Zealand Rhodes Scholars
Oxford University Boat Club rowers
Olympic medalists in rowing
People educated at Nelson College
New Zealand recipients of the Military Cross
Medalists at the 1912 Summer Olympics
Sportspeople from Nelson, New Zealand
Australian Rhodes Scholars
New Zealand people of Scottish descent
New Zealand military personnel of World War I